Ramón Borrero y Cortázar (1824–1895), brother of former President of Ecuador, Antonio Borrero, was himself President of Ecuador briefly from October 11, 1883 until February 17, 1884. The provisional government's mandate having expired without it having named an interim President, Borrero assumed the role as a result of his holding the position of President of the Senate.

Ramón Borrero was a delegate to both the 1861 and 1884 Constitutional Conventions. He was also a prolific scholar and writer.

External links
 Official Website of the Ecuadorian Government about the country President's History

1824 births
1895 deaths
Presidents of Ecuador
Ecuadorian male writers